Deceptor is a genus of flowering plants belonging to the family Orchidaceae.

Its native range is Indo-China.

Species:
 Deceptor bidoupensis (Tixier & Guillaumin) Seidenf.

References

Aeridinae
Orchid genera